The Filipino Academy of Movie Arts and Sciences bestowed the Gregorio Valdez Memorial Award to Filipino producers and film industry leaders of distinction whose body of films produced and/or film industry achievements have given merit to the Filipino film industry as a whole, as well as Filipino film producers in other countries whose body of work is recognized in that particular country.

Recipients

 1972 Joseph Estrada
 1974 Guillermo de la Vega
 1980 Eddie Garcia
 1982 Marichu Perez - Maceda
 1987 Manuel Morato

References

External links
The Unofficial Website of the Filipino Academy of Movie Arts and Sciences

FAMAS Award